An ironmonger is one who deals in metal goods, including tools and hardware.

Ironmonger may also refer to:

Places
 Ironmonger Lane, street in the City of London
 Ironmonger Row Baths, public washhouse in Islington, London

People
 Bert Ironmonger (1882–1971), Australian cricketer
 Duncan Ironmonger (born 1931), Australian economist
 John Ironmonger (footballer) (born 1961), Australian rules footballer
 John Ironmonger (writer) (born 1954), British writer
 Moses Ironmonger (1809–1887), English industrialist and mayor

Fictional characters
 Iron Monger, an identity used by several Marvel supervillains

Other
 Worshipful Company of Ironmongers, a livery company of the City of London